The BBÖ 181 was a class of 27 two-cylinder compound 2-10-0 tender locomotives of the Federal Railways of Austria (Bundesbahnen Österreichs, BBÖ).

History 
After the First World War, two-cylinder simple locomotive designs became more and more popular because of the lower acquisition and operating costs. Since the now smaller Austria had lost almost all of its coal reserves, the coal-saving compound locomotives were reconsidered and 27 of the BBÖ 81 locomotives under construction by the Wiener Neustädter Lokomotivfabrik were equipped as composite locomotives. Due to the large low-pressure cylinder, the leading axle had to be moved further forward.

The locomotives were designated as the 181 series and were delivered in 1922 and 1923; they were used mainly in mountain service.

However, due to falling coal prices, interest in compound locomotives was soon lost again, and so the 181 series was the last compound locomotive series built in Austria.

In 1938 they all came to the Deutsche Reichsbahn as 58 801–827, but the Deutsche Reichsbahn had no interest in them. After the Second World War, eight of them came to the ÖBB, which they planned as series 158, but which were retired in 1953. Fifteen locomotives went as class 29 to the Yugoslav State Railways (JDŽ) and were initially given the numbers 29–101 to 29-115. In 1948 they were renumbered to JDŽ 29–028 to 29-042.

References 

2-10-0 locomotives
1′E h2v locomotives
Wiener Neustädter locomotives
811
Standard gauge locomotives of Austria
Railway locomotives introduced in 1922
Freight locomotives